Skrzyńsko  is a village in the administrative district of Gmina Przysucha, within Przysucha County, Masovian Voivodeship, in east-central Poland.

The village has a population of 1,200.

The town is known for a legend about a giant  half kilogram spider that killed multiple priests before being defeated.

References

Villages in Przysucha County